Big Bang Vol. 1 – Since 2007 is the debut studio album by South Korean boy band Big Bang, released on December 22, 2006 through YG Entertainment. The album debuted at number three on the old monthly album charts in South Korea in December 2006, moving 33,000 units in its first month. It went on to sell over 110,000 copies in total.

Four singles were released to support of the album including three single albums: "Big Bang", "Big Bang Is V.I.P", "Big Bang 03", and "Dirty Cash". Members of the group participated in penning lyrics to their songs.

Background 
BigBang was the first idol group formed by YG Entertainment, whose previous roster included hip hop groups Jinusean and 1TYM. The quintet held their official debut on August 19, 2006 at the Gymnastics Arena in Seoul Olympic Park during the YG Family 10th Year Concert, which was broadcast the following month. Their first single "Big Bang", released shortly thereafter, contained the songs "We Belong Together", featuring label mate Park Bom; "A Fool's Only Tears" (Revised Romanization: Nunmulppunin Babo); and "This Love", an adaptation of the American rock band Maroon 5 song, rewritten and performed by G-Dragon.

Commercial performance 
The first single released for the album went on to sell nearly 40,000 copies. The second single, "Big Bang Is V.I.P", was released in September, eventually topping 32,000 copies sold. Their last single, "Big Bang 03", followed, with final sales nearing 40,000 copies. The group held their first concert, The Real, that December, followed by their debut album, BigBang Vol. 1 – Since 2007; it sold over 48,000 copies by the end of February 2007 and eventually over 110,000 copies total.

Track listing

Charts

Weekly charts

Monthly charts

Yearly charts

Sales

References

External links
 Big Bang official website

2006 debut albums
BigBang (South Korean band) albums
YG Entertainment albums
Korean-language albums
Albums produced by G-Dragon